Lykogiannis is a Greek surname. Notable people with this surname include:

 Aris Lykogiannis (born 1969), Greek professional basketball coach
 Charalampos Lykogiannis (born 1993), Greek professional footballer, also known as Lykos

Greek-language surnames